The men's C-2 500 metres event was an open-style, pairs canoeing event conducted as part of the Canoeing at the 2000 Summer Olympics program.

Medalists

Results

Heats
15 teams entered in two heats. The top three finishers from each heat advanced to the finals while the remaining teams were relegated to the semifinal.

Overall Results Heats

Semifinal
The top three finishers from the semifinal advanced to the final.

Final

Novák and Pulai were known as "The Monster and the Little Guy" because Pulai was 1.99 meters (6 ft. 6.25 in.) tall and weighed 97 kg (214 lbs) while Novák was 1.72 meters (5 ft. 8 in.) and weighed 77 kg (170 lbs). Pulai taped Novák's leg to the boat so that his partner would not fall to the high winds that took place on the day of the final.

References
2000 Summer Olympics Canoe sprint results. 
Sports-reference.com 2000 C-2 500 m results.
Wallechinsky, David and Jaime Loucky (2008). "Canoeing: Men's Canadian Doubles 500 Meters". In The Complete Book of the Olympics: 2008 Edition. London: Aurum Press Limited. p. 482.

Men's C-2 500
Men's events at the 2000 Summer Olympics